SportsCall is a regional sports call-in show centered in Auburn, Alabama. SportsCall host JJ Jackson and the guys offer insight into the world of sports, interview guests, and take phone calls from listeners. Established in 1995, the show is noted as being the Auburn area's first and longest tenured call-in sports show.

The show can be heard on 93.9 FM WTGZ-FM ("The Tiger") and 620 AM WTRP in LaGrange, Georgia or through the website.

It airs Monday through Friday from 4pmCT to 6pmCT both live from various sites in and around Auburn, and from the Tiger Communications studios.

History 

During Auburn University's football season, Bill Cameron and Will Moon hosted "The SportsCall Tailgate Show", two and a half hours before every Auburn University Football game.

Immediately after the game "The Real Postgame Show", hosted by Will Moon and Ben Brown, went live for two hours of fans reactions, postgame interviews and scoreboard updates.

Previous hosts include: The late beloved retired Auburn High Athletics Director Chuck Furlow, Reid Slider, Taylor Jones, Bill Cameron, Jasher Cox, Drew Peacock, Dan Peck, Andy Burcham

American sports radio programs
Auburn, Alabama